The Connecticut Education Association (CEA) is a grassroots organization championing for teachers and public schools. It has been a leading voice for teacher professionalism and school improvement since it was formed in 1848 when 80 teachers met in Meriden.

CEA is headquartered in Hartford. Its members are public school teachers, including preschool through grade 12 teachers in Connecticut public schools as well as retired teachers and college students preparing to become teachers. It lobbies for legislation at the state and federal levels, represents the rights of teachers, and works with state policymakers to continue to elevate the teaching profession and promote public education.

Structure and operation 

CEA has more than 160 local affiliates and is governed by a board of directors of approximately 35 elected members. The board meets regularly throughout the year to set goals, approve policy, and implement specific measures adopted by CEA's highest-policy making body, the Representative Assembly (RA).

The RA meets annually each May to set policy, including approving a budget, adopting resolutions, voting on new business items, and making any amendments to the CEA constitution and bylaws.

CEA's four executive offices, president, vice president, secretary, and treasurer, are elected at the RA. Elected to three-year terms, they can serve a maximum of two terms. The president and vice president are full-time officers.

CEA's staff is headed by an executive director who oversees staff in Hartford and regional offices. Staff members include lawyers, lobbyists, trainers, field staff, policy experts, communications professionals, and more.

Accomplishments 
CEA is a state affiliate of the National Education Association and has made teachers a force in the legislative process. CEA members take an active role at the state legislature and in local communities across the state, advocating for education and investments in public schools. CEA's legislative successes include the following achievements:

 Helped prevent loss of school days to teacher strikes with passage of a binding arbitration law.
 Championed a bill to implement indoor air quality programs in public schools.
 Amended the State Teacher Evaluation Guidelines to prohibit school districts from using a single, isolated, standardized test score to assess educators.

References

External links
 CEA homepage
 BlogCEA

Educational organizations based in the United States
Non-profit organizations based in Connecticut
Education in Connecticut